Labarrus lividus is a species of dung beetles in the subfamily Aphodiinae.

References

Further reading

 
 
 
 
 

Scarabaeidae
Beetles described in 1789